Basketball at the 2005 Islamic Solidarity Games was held in Medina from April 9 to April 19, 2005.

Medalists

Preliminary round

Group A

Group B

Group C

Group D

Quarterfinals

Group I

Group II

Group III

Group IV

Classification

Knockout round

Final rankings

References
Goalzz

Islamic Games
2005 Islamic Solidarity Games
2005
International basketball competitions hosted by Saudi Arabia